The 2010 WPS College Draft took place on January 15, 2010. It was the second college draft held by Women's Professional Soccer to assign the WPS rights of college players to the American-based teams.

Format
Official WPS release
 Atlanta Beat select first, Philadelphia Independence select second
 Existing teams draft 3 – 9 in reverse order of regular season finish in all rounds
 Expansion teams also draft 10th & 11th in first round only

Round 1

Round 2

Round 3

Round 4

Round 5

Round 6

Round 7

Draft Notes
WPS transactions pages '09'10

See also

2010
Draft
WPS Draft